The 1986 Philippine presidential and vice presidential elections were held on February 7, 1986. Popularly known as the 1986 snap election, it is among the landmark events that led up to the People Power Revolution, the downfall of the presidency of Ferdinand Marcos, and the accession of Corazon C. Aquino as president.

Background

Influence of the American media 
After being dared by an American journalist, President Ferdinand E. Marcos declared a snap election during an interview on the American Broadcasting Company political affairs programme, This Week with David Brinkley in November 1985. On December 3, the Batasang Pambansa (National Assembly) passed a law setting the date of the election on February 7, 1986. On February 4, 1986, Marcos declared February 6 and 7 as nationwide non-working special public holidays to "give all registered voters fullest opportunity to exercise their right of suffrage."

The assassination of Senator Benigno "Ninoy" Aquino Jr. on August 21, 1983, revived the oppositionist press, and the pro-Marcos press soon retaliated. Both catered to the intense news-hunger of the Filipino people, but it was a smaller group of reporters who delivered the crucial blow to Marcos' image, with reports about Marcos' hidden wealth and falsified war record. An example would be the article written by Eduardo Lachica in December 1982 that stirred interest after it had been published in The Asian Wall Street Journal on the Marcos property holdings in New York.

By late January 1985, the pursuit for the truth behind the rumors began with Lewis M. Simons, a Tokyo-based correspondent for the San Jose Mercury News, who sent a memo to his desk editor, Jonathan Krim. There had been incessant speculations of Philippine "capital flight" that not only involved Ferdinand and Imelda Marcos themselves, but also government officials and friends of the first family. Simons provided Krim with a list of names, telling him to look into Philippine investments in the San Francisco Bay area. Krim handed over several clips (including Lachica's article) and miscellaneous letters from the Filipino exile community to the investigative reporter attached with a note, "Look into this." Carey began his paper trail after setting up his personal computer and a telephone modem as well as using real-estate data bases to acquire both California and out-of-state records. Another method he used in tracking the story were his interviews with the members of the Filipino exiled opposition who were divided between those who were resolute in helping him and those who deemed themselves apolitical, fearing reprisals if they spoke. In an interview, Carey says, "I kept telling them, 'I'm not interested in quoting people, I'm not going to use yours or any names. I'm interested in documentary evidence,' That convinced people...." Due to budgetary concerns, he continued his trail by exploring records in New York and Chicago through telephone. At a later date, Katherine Ellison from the San Francisco Bureau, who Carey called a "great investigative reporter," joined the group as they conducted interviews and convinced reluctant locals to provide essential information.

On June 23–25, 1985, the Mercury News series under the by-lines of Carey, Ellison, and Simons elicited a staggering response after revealing a list of names, showing how the Filipino elite had illegally invested millions in the U.S., why real estate conditions made California a prime investment territory, and how capital flight fueled Philippine insurgency. Meanwhile, local publications in the Philippines such as Malaya, Veritas, Business Day, and Mr. and Mrs. all reprinted the series. There were protests on the streets, attempts by the National Assembly's opposition minority to file an impeachment hearing  (which was quickly annulled) while Marcos was forced to order an impartial inquiry (though it lasted briefly).

The international clamor surprised the three Mercury News investigators with Carey commenting, "There's a vast difference between simple allegations and something with a factual, documentary basis," he says. "It provokes a totally different psychological reaction in the readers. Gossip stirs their apathy; facts galvanize them to action."

After the successful publication of the series, newer articles were produced by the Mercury News team, among other things, such as how the Manila elitists smuggled fortunes, in the form of American currency, out of the country. More reporters from The Washington Post, The Wall Street Journal, and The New York Times developed other angles as well. The most significant were those uncovered by Times' Jeff Gerth, who wrote on the misuse of American aid money by the Marcos' administration. Although Marcos continued to deny these allegations, that did little to avert the consequences. His support in the congress quickly dissipated while news of his misrule endangered U.S. military interests. Revelations of Marcos' hidden wealth disparaged him in America, but in the Philippines, it was the truth of his war records that did him in.

Organizing the 1986 Philippine elections 
On November 4, 1985, Sam Donaldson and George Will interviewed President Marcos on the American Broadcasting Company political affairs program This Week with David Brinkley. Marcos was being asked about his policies and support when, without warning, he announced that he would hold a snap election on February 7, 1986, a year earlier than the supposed 1987 election. Marcos said that in the snap election, the vice president would also be determined. Also, the final decision regarding the election would be determined by the National Assembly. On December 3, 1985, the Batasang Pambansa passed a law setting the date of the election on February 7, 1986.

Marcos declared the early elections since he believed that this would solidify the support of United States, silence the protests and criticisms both in the Philippines and the United States, and finally put the issues regarding the death of Benigno Aquino Jr. to rest.

The opposition saw two problems regarding the announcement of Marcos. First is the credibility of the announcement since at the time two-thirds of the National Assembly were from Kilusang Bagong Lipunan, which means that they could decide not to push through with the snap election. This would then give Marcos an image that he was willing to entertain opposition, which would then contribute to his popularity. Second problem is that the opposition was yet to choose a single presidential candidate to who had a chance to win. This posed a problem for them since the opposition were yet to be united, supporting only one presidential candidate.

The opposition, was divided between the widow of Benigno Aquino Jr., Corazon "Cory" Aquino, and Doy Laurel, son of President Jose P. Laurel. Cardinal Jaime Sin talked to both the potential candidates. Aquino was hesitant to run since she believed that she was not the best and most able choice. Aquino said she would be willing to run if there was a petition campaign with at least a million signatures supporting her as a presidential candidate. Doy on the other hand, was earnest in running as president since he believed his family background, training, and experience had prepared him for the presidency.

Campaign
The campaign period lasted 45 days, from December 19, 1985, to February 5, 1986.

As the election campaign continued, Marcos was able to campaign in selected key cities while Aquino was able to campaign intensively and extensively, even going to remote places from the north of the Philippines to the south of the Philippines. The Aquino campaign concluded a rally that is believed to have 800,000 participants wearing yellow in Rizal Park and Roxas Boulevard forming a "sea of yellow".

Results

About 85,000 precincts opened at seven o'clock in the morning of Election Day. Each precinct was administered by a Board of Election Inspectors (BEI), which was tasked to oversee voting. The BEI did not continuously abide by the stipulated voting procedure, which raised the impression of fraud.

The voting period was also scheduled to close at three o'clock in the afternoon but was extended to give way for people who were in line. Counting of the ballots followed and in most precincts was able to finish by six o'clock in the evening.

Results showed that a huge percentage of eligible voters did not vote. Out of the 26 million registered voters, only 20 million ballots were cast. This showed a decreased percentage of voters from the 1984 election, which had 89% of registered voters cast their ballots, to around 76% during the snap election.

A number of disenfranchised voters were evident during the snap election.

COMELEC tally

President 

The COMELEC proclaimed Marcos as the winner, receiving more than 1.5 million votes more than the next contender, Cory Aquino. In the COMELEC's tally, a total of 10,807,197 votes was for Marcos alone. Conversely, NAMFREL's partial tally had Aquino leading with more than half a million votes.

Vice president

NAMFREL tally 
These are for 69.03% of the voting precincts that reported.

President

Vice president

Comparison between the tallies

Aftermath 
The conduct of the February 7, 1986, snap election led to the popular belief that the polls were tampered with and considered the results to be fraudulent. The following days consisted of debates and actions as a sign of aversion to the conduct of the election. But in the end, according to the International Observer Delegation, the "election of the February 7 was not conducted in a free and fair manner" due to the influence and power of the administration of Ferdinand Marcos. The International Observer Delegation stated that the proclamation of the victors of the election was invalid because the Batasan "ignored explicit provisions of the Philippine Electoral Code [Batas Pambansa Blg. 881] requiring that the tampered or altered election returns be set aside during the final counting process, despite protests by representatives of the opposition parts". After further investigation, a multinational team of observers cited cases of vote-buying, intimidation, snatching of ballot boxes, tampered election returns and the disenfranchisement of thousands of voters.

On February 9, thirty-five computer programmers walked out of the COMELEC's electronic quick count at the Philippine International Convention Center, some fearing for their safety and seeking sanctuary in Baclaran Church. The technicians—whose protest was broadcast live on national television—claimed that the Marcos camp had manipulated the election results.

The Catholic Bishops' Conference of the Philippines President Cardinal Ricardo Vidal released a declaration stating that "a government does not of itself freely correct the evil it has inflicted on the people then it is our serious moral obligation as a people to make it do so." The declaration also asked "every loyal member of the Church, every community of the faithful, to form their judgment about the February 7 polls" telling all the Filipinos "[n]ow is the time to speak up.  Now is the time to repair the wrong.  The wrong was systematically organized.  So must its correction be.  But as in the election itself, that depends fully on the people; on what they are willing and ready to do." The United States Senate passed a resolution stating the same. This chain of events eventually led to the resignation of Marcos' Defense Minister Juan Ponce Enrile, and Armed Forces Vice-Chief of Staff General Fidel Ramos. Enrile and Ramos then secluded themselves in the military and police headquarters of Camp Aguinaldo and Camp Crame, respectively, leading to the People Power Revolution from February 22 to 25, 1986, which toppled the Marcos dictatorship.

Honored individuals 

A number of individuals who were killed in an effort to protect the integrity of the 1986 Philippine presidential election have been formally honored as "heroes" at the Philippines' Bantayog ng mga Bayani (lit. 'Monument of Heroes'). These include Jeremias de Jesus, Evelio Javier, Francisco Laurella, Salvador Leaño, Fernando Pastor Sr., and Michael Sumilang.

In media 
The snap elections and their aftermath are dramatized in the 1988 film A Dangerous Life.

See also
Commission on Elections
Politics of the Philippines
Philippine elections
President of the Philippines

References

External links
 The Philippine Electoral Almanac, prepared by the Presidential Communications Development and Strategic Planning Office (PCDSPO)
 Corazon C. Aquino page  from the Presidential Museum and Library (also under the PCDSPO), contains results of the 1986 snap elections from the Philippine Electoral Almanac
 An Act Calling a Special Election for President and Vice-President, Providing for the Manner of the Holding Thereof, Appropriating Funds Therefor, and For Other Purposes, Batas Pambansa Blg. 883 (National Law No. 883), via the Supreme Court E-Library
 Official website of the Commission on Elections
 1986 Philippines Elections
 Photo Gallery of 1986 Snap Elections from the National Citizens' Movement for Free Elections (NAMFREL)

Radio commercials
 Marcos-Aquino 1986 Presidential Election Campaign Part 1
 Part 2
 Part 3
 Part 4
 Part 5

1986 elections in the Philippines
People Power Revolution
1986
Electoral fraud in the Philippines
Annulled elections
Special elections in the Philippines